Vasilyevka is a rural locality (a village) in Zabolotskoye Rural Settlement, Permsky District, Perm Krai, Russia. The population was 30 as of 2010. There are five streets.

Geography 
Vasilyevka is located 66 km southwest of Perm (the district's administrative centre) by road. Verkh-Rechka is the nearest rural locality.

References 

Rural localities in Permsky District